a jj 12" is an EP by the Swedish band jj, released on their label Sincerely Yours in December 2009. It consists of two songs from jj n° 2, "from africa to málaga" and "intermezzo", and two previously unreleased songs, "baby" and "the truth". A video for the song "baby", directed by Marcus Söderlund featuring slow-motion footage of horses, was released on the Sincerely Yours website. It was released as a 12" vinyl in a limited amount as well as made available for download.

Track listing
 "from africa to málaga" – 2:50
 "baby" – 2:04
 "intermezzo" – 2:48
 "the truth" – 2:31

References

JJ (Swedish band) albums
2009 EPs